Clarence Watson Meadows (February 11, 1904September 12, 1961) was the 22nd Governor of West Virginia from 1945 to 1949. He was the first governor of West Virginia to be born in the 20th century.

Meadows was born and raised in Beckley. As a youth, he showed a passion for public speaking, and his parents attempted to direct him toward a career as a Baptist minister. However, Meadows was instead drawn toward the stage and, after receiving a degree from Washington and Lee University, he became active in his hometown's theater troupe.  Meadows received a law degree from the University of Alabama in 1927 and subsequently entered into an active career in politics. In 1930, Meadows won in his first run for elective office, as he entered the West Virginia House of Delegates for a single term. He chose not to run for reelection, but instead successfully earned a position as Raleigh County District Attorney. In 1936, Meadows entered state politics, with the first of his two terms as West Virginia Attorney General. Because of his candor and honest disposition, Meadows became one of the most respected politicians in the state. In 1942, he accepted an appointment as a judge for the state's Tenth Judicial Circuit.

Using a then-modern campaign that featured an array of radio appearances, Meadows was easily elected governor in 1944. As governor, his priorities included ameliorating labor strife in the coal industry, increasing access to quality education, and improving transportation to the geographically isolated state.

At the conclusion of his term, Meadows returned to his law practice. In 1957, he retired to Florida and assisted Democrats in his new state with campaigning. He died in 1961 while visiting relatives in Clifton Forge, Virginia.

External links
Biography of Clarence W. Meadows
Inaugural Address of Clarence W. Meadows
Clarence Watson Meadows
Clarence W. Meadows
 (subscription required for online access)

1904 births
1961 deaths
Democratic Party governors of West Virginia
Lawyers from Beckley, West Virginia
Baptists from West Virginia
West Virginia Attorneys General
Democratic Party members of the West Virginia House of Delegates
20th-century American lawyers
20th-century American politicians
20th-century Baptists
Politicians from Beckley, West Virginia